Mohamed Ali Camara (born 28 August 1997) is a Guinean professional footballer who plays as a centre-back for Swiss Super League club Young Boys. Camara is nicknamed Piqué, named after his footballing idol Gerard Piqué.

Club career
Camara began his professional career with Horoya AC in Guinea in 2016. After a season on loan with Hafia from Horoya, Camara signed a five-year contract with Hapoel Ra'anana on 14 July 2017. He made his professional debut for Ra'anana in a 0–0 Israeli Premier League tie with Hapoel Ironi Kiryat Shmona F.C. on 19 August 2017.

After a successful season, Camara joined BSC Young Boys on 6 July 2018, agreeing a contract until 2022.

International career
Camara represented the Guinea U20s at the 2017 FIFA U-20 World Cup, and the 2017 Africa U-20 Cup of Nations.

Camara made his international debut for the senior Guinea national team in a friendly 2–0 loss to Mauritania on 24 March 2018.

Career statistics

Club

Honours 
Young Boys
 Swiss Super League: 2018–19, 2019–20, 2020–21
 Swiss Cup: 2019–20

References

External links
 
 Young Boys Profile
 SFL Profile
 

1997 births
Living people
Sportspeople from Conakry
Guinean footballers
Guinea international footballers
BSC Young Boys players
Hapoel Ra'anana A.F.C. players
Swiss Super League players
Israeli Premier League players
Association football defenders
Guinean expatriate footballers
Guinean expatriate sportspeople in Switzerland
Guinean expatriate sportspeople in Israel
Expatriate footballers in Switzerland
Expatriate footballers in Israel
2021 Africa Cup of Nations players